Brent LaRue (born April 26, 1987) is an American-born Slovenian athlete from Kernersville, North Carolina. An alumnus of Wake Forest University, he represented Slovenia in the men's 400 meters hurdles at the 2012 Summer Olympics.

Personal life 
LaRue attended East Forsyth High School in Kernersville, North Carolina where he was a track standout. He went on to attend Wake Forest University. LaRue's track career at Wake Forest included being a 2-time NCAA All-American and 4-time ACC Champion.

While at Wake Forest, LaRue met Ana Jerman, a Wake Forest tennis player originally from Slovenia. They moved to Slovenia, where they got married in 2010. In July 2011 LaRue received Slovenian citizenship. He holds a Masters Degree in International Business. He currently works in the tech industry and is a co-founder of the telehealth app Circle Medical. He currently lives in Switzerland with his wife and daughter.

References

General

Specific

1987 births
Living people
Olympic athletes of Slovenia
Athletes (track and field) at the 2012 Summer Olympics
Sportspeople from North Carolina
Slovenian male hurdlers